Buxach is a river of Bavaria, Germany.

Its source is southeast of the municipality of Kronburg, near the  Heißenschwende. The Buxach is straightened only few places in Hart and Buxach (two districts of Memmingen), most of its course it flows freely. The river banks are surrounded by forests and villages as well as meadows. The water of the Buxheimer Weiher does not flow back into the Buxach, but into the Reutenbach. The Buxach itself flows west from Buxheim on the Illerstadion into the Iller.

In former times, the Buxach also fed the Memminger municipal pond southward of Hart. The pond was drained around 1900, today still the name of the street "Am Stadtweiher" ("at the municipal pond") is a reminder. Especially in Hart and Buxach, the river was used for industry. In Hart, there was a copper hammer, and several mills and copper hammers existed in Buxach. At the east of Kronburg, an oil mill was operated.

At Buxheim, west of the pond Buxheimer Weiher, the river Reutenbach diverges from the Buxach. The Reutenbach flows northwards through Buxheim and feeds a fish pond near Egelsee (district of Memmingen), then also flows into the river Iller.

See also
List of rivers of Bavaria

References

Rivers of Bavaria
Rivers of Germany